Wykeham /ˈwɪk.əm/ is a deserted medieval village in the civil parish of Weston in the South Holland district of Lincolnshire, England.

Wykeham is the site of the ruined chapel of Saint Nicholas and the earthwork remains of Wykeham Hall, which was the country residence of the Prior of Spalding. The limestone chapel, which was built in 1311, became a free chapel at the dissolution, but the roof collapsed in 1782 and it remains a roofless shell. The chapel is now a Grade I listed building and the site is a scheduled monument.

References

Deserted medieval villages in Lincolnshire
Ruins in Lincolnshire